The National Quiz Bee is currently the longest-running national academic quiz competition in the Philippines. Starting out as a national spelling bee in 1977, the National Quiz Bee currently awards champions in mathematics, science, general information, and Philippine history. The show aired on IBC from 1996 to 2001 and Studio 23 from 2005 to 2013 and are hosted by Eddie Lacsi, Bingbing Josue, Pettizou Tayag, Atom Araullo, Spanky Enriquez and Danny Fajardo.

The National Quiz Bee is organized by the Quiz Bee Foundation. The program enjoys generous support from the private sector, which mostly provides for the prizes and TV coverage. The National Quiz Bee is also endorsed and assisted by various agencies of the Philippine government, including the Department of Education (DepEd), Commission on Higher Education (CHED), Department of the Interior and Local Government (DILG), the Senate of the Philippines, and the Office of the President.

History

Since 1977, the Quiz Bee has been consistently organized as a yearly event. It was also in this year that Mr. Tayag registered the term "quiz bee" as a copyright and trademark with the Philippine Patent Office?.

For this competition, the category of Philippine history and culture was expanded to include ASEAN history and culture.

In 1993, in consonance with the Philippines 2000 program of President Fidel V. Ramos, the competition now included high school and college students, and the name was changed to the National Super Quiz Bee.

Eligibility Rules
Any school recognized by DepEd was eligible to compete. It must field students who are enrolled at the school at the designated level at the time the season starts. Any student enrolled in the present school year from any private or public school, college or university in the Philippines. Thus, Philippine schools abroad which are recognized by DepEd are technically ineligible.
As is common in televised academic quiz formats in the Philippines, which promote the 'give-chance-to-others' concept, an individual can become Grand Champion only once per level. This means that winning the elementary Grand Championship twice is not allowed, but winning 1 elementary and 1 high school Grand Championship is.

Subject Categories
Unlike other quiz competitions, the Quiz Bee assigns particular subject categories for each educational level:

Summit of the Super Quiz Bee
Summit of the Super Quiz Bee is a multiday camp (usually 4 days) composed with tours, seminars, and fellowships for regional champions and respective teacher-coaches competing in the National Finals.

The National Finals competition is the highlight of the summit, wherein the various contestants and their teacher-coaches dress in traditional regional attire during the stage competition. The National Finals is open to the public.

Tournament Schedule

Special Quiz Bees

In addition to the annual National Quiz Bee, the Quiz Bee has also organized ASEAN and World Quiz Bees. National Champions of the immediately previous National Quiz Bee represent the country against competitors from ASEAN-member countries and worldwide, respectively.

There has also been a Quiz Bee for the Handicapped.

Hosts
Throughout its long existence, the National Quiz Bee has been hosted by numerous personalities, including the following. It is common for them to share a single episode, with one acting as quizmaster, while the other recap scores and make other announcements:

Venues

For non-NCR regions, Division and Regional Eliminations are usually in schools and DepEd offices within their region.

NCR District, Division, and Regional Eliminations are usually held in major shopping malls around Metro Manila and are televised.

The National Finals and the Summit of the Super Quiz Bees have been held at the following locations:

Prizes
Prizes for Regional Champions have been given at some point, although this is not consistent every year.

Champions, Finalists, and Other Winners

See also
List of programs previously broadcast by Intercontinental Broadcasting Corporation
List of programs aired by Studio 23

References

Intellectual competitions
Education in the Philippines
1996 Philippine television series debuts
2001 Philippine television series endings
2008 Philippine television series debuts
2013 Philippine television series endings
1990s Philippine television series
Intercontinental Broadcasting Corporation original programming
Studio 23 original programming
Filipino-language television shows
English-language television shows